Julius Avery is an Australian screenwriter and film director.

Life and works 
After growing up in Pemberton, Western Australia, Avery attended The Victorian College of the Arts in Melbourne. He has written and directed several award winning short films including Cannes jury prize winning short film Jerrycan in 2008. Avery wrote and produced Yardbird in 2012, an award winning short film nominated for several major awards including the Palme d’Or at Cannes. Both were produced through Avery’s production company Bridle Path Films.

In 2014, Avery wrote and directed his first feature, Australian crime thriller film Son of a Gun starring Brenton Thwaites, Ewan McGregor, Alicia Vikander, and Jacek Koman. The film was nominated for Best Film at The London Film Festival, BFI awards. Son of a Gun was produced in association with Avery’s company Bridle Path Films.

Avery directed the war horror film Overlord (2018) for Bad Robot Productions and Paramount Pictures. Overlord stars Jovan Adepo, Wyatt Russell, Pilou Asbæk, Iain De Caestecker, John Magaro and Mathilde Ollivier. The film was produced by J. J. Abrams and Lindsey Weber and written by Billy Ray and Mark L. Smith.

Along with being announced as the director of The Heavy, a Paramount and Bad Robot production, Avery had been recruited by 20th Century Fox to write and direct a remake of Flash Gordon alongside Matthew Vaughn who was to be producing. However, following Disney's acquisition of 21st Century Fox's assets, the film was cancelled. He instead directed MGM's Samaritan, a dark superhero film starring Sylvester Stallone, released in 2022.

Filmography
Shorts films
Matchbox (2002)
Little Man (2004)
Solvent (2004)
End of Town (2006)
The Tank (2007)
Jerrycan (2008)
Yardbird (2012) - writer only

Feature films
 Son of a Gun (2014) (Also writer)
 Overlord (2018)
 Samaritan (2022)
 The Pope's Exorcist (2023)

References

External links

Living people
Australian film directors
Year of birth missing (living people)
Australian male screenwriters
Australian film producers